Francis Adams Cherry Sr. (September 5, 1908 – July 15, 1965), was an American jurist and the 35th governor of Arkansas, elected as a Democrat for a single two-year term from 1953 to 1955.

Biography
Cherry was born in Fort Worth, Texas, the son of a Rock Island Lines railroad conductor. He and his four older siblings grew up in El Reno and Enid, Oklahoma, where he graduated from high school in 1926. He graduated from Oklahoma State University, (then A&M College), in Stillwater in 1930.

In 1932, Cherry moved to Fayetteville to attend the University of Arkansas Law School. He received his law degree in 1936. He moved to Jonesboro in northeastern Arkansas to establish a law practice.

Political career 
In 1936, he was appointed U.S. Commissioner for the Jonesboro division of the Eastern district and in 1940 he was named referee to the Workers' Compensation Commission by Governor Carl E. Bailey.

In 1942, Cherry was elected chancellor and probate judge of the 12th Judicial District, which included Clay, Crittenden, Greene, Craighead, Mississippi, and Poinsett counties. During World War II, Cherry waived his judicial immunity, and applied for a commission in the United States Navy. He served for the last two years of World War II.

Cherry was elected governor in 1952. He defeated the two-term incumbent Sidney Sanders McMath in the primary. He then overwhelmed the Republican candidate, Jefferson W. Speck, 342,292 (87.4 percent) to 49,292 (12.6 percent), who had also lost to McMath in the 1950 general election. Speck (1916–1993) was a planter and businessman from Frenchmans Bayou in Mississippi County in eastern Arkansas. At the time of his death, he was living in Kerrville in the Texas Hill Country. In a post-election statement, Speck said that the GOP had done nothing to assist his two gubernatorial campaigns. He further alleged that the Arkansas GOP would "never fully develop and take its place in Arkansas politics under its present leadership.... The same tired old men—old in ideas, old in hopes—will still keep a death grip on southern Republicanism." (Little Rock Arkansas Democrat, November 5, 1952)

Cherry's administration was responsible for establishing the Department of Finance and Administration and promoted industrial development. When Cherry ran for a second term, he was defeated in a runoff primary by Orval Eugene Faubus of Madison County. Faubus then defeated the Republican Pratt C. Remmel, the mayor of Little Rock, to win the first of his six terms as governor. In that race, former GOP nominee Jefferson Speck endorsed Faubus to protest the state party leadership.

He was only the second governor in Arkansas history to have been denied a second term—the first was Tom Jefferson Terral, who was defeated in 1926. After the governorship, Republican U.S. President Dwight D. Eisenhower appointed Cherry, a staunch anti-communist, to head the Subversive Activities Control Board, a position that continued under Democratic presidents John F. Kennedy and Lyndon B. Johnson.

In his scrapbook memoirs Down From the Hills, Faubus tells a story of having checked into a motel in El Reno, Oklahoma, in 1954, while he was en route on a family trip to Colorado, after having defeated Cherry in the runoff. The motel clerk told Faubus that the Cherrys were an "old-line Republican family" in Oklahoma, but "some fellow beat him this last time." When Cherry ran for office, he sought the governorship as a Democrat at a time when Arkansas had virtually no Republican presence. Cherry's Democratic label did not keep Eisenhower from naming him to the SACB.

Later life, death, and legacy 
In 1963, after a heart operation in Houston, Texas, Cherry was unable to devote full-time to his duties but went to his office in Washington, D.C., several times a week. He died in Washington on July 15, 1965. The first of two funeral services was held at his home in Washington. Then the body was transported to Little Rock to lie in state in the rotunda of the Arkansas State Capitol. Services were also held at the First Presbyterian Church of Jonesboro. Interment was at Oaklawn Cemetery in Jonesboro.

Cherry was married to the former Margaret Frierson (1912–1990), originally of Jonesboro. They had two sons, Haskille Cherry (1940–2007) and Francis Cherry, Jr., and a daughter, Charlotte Cherry, then all of Washington, D.C.  Margaret and older son, Haskille Cherry, were living in Williamsburg, Virginia, at the time of their deaths.

Governor Faubus and President Johnson were particularly magnanimous in their public statements of mourning on Cherry's death. Faubus said that his former rival rendered "fine service". Johnson said that Cherry left "a rich legacy of accomplishment... I particularly want to extend my sympathy to his family and dear ones and to the countless citizens of Arkansas who have lost in his passing a distinguished leader and a native son whose devotion to constitutional principles and human dignity won him the confidence and admiration of all who knew him."

In 1964, he was named "Alumnus of the Year" from Arkansas graduates of OSU.

Cherry's papers were donated to the Archives and Special Collections of Arkansas State University.

See also
List of governors of Arkansas
List of members of the American Legion

References

External links
 Encyclopedia of Arkansas History & Culture entry: Francis Adams Cherry
 "Francis A. Cherry, Governor in '53–55, Dies in Washington", Arkansas Gazette, July 16, 1965
 "Cherry Left 'Rich Legacy', President Says", Arkansas Gazette, July 16, 1965
 "Rendered 'Fine Service', Says Faubus", Arkansas Gazette, July 16, 1965
 Orval Eugene Faubus, Down From the Hills (Little Rock, 1980)

1908 births
1965 deaths
Politicians from Fort Worth, Texas
American Presbyterians
Democratic Party governors of Arkansas
People from El Reno, Oklahoma
Politicians from Enid, Oklahoma
Politicians from Jonesboro, Arkansas
United States Navy officers
United States Navy personnel of World War II
University of Arkansas School of Law alumni
Oklahoma State University alumni
Arkansas lawyers
Arkansas state court judges
American planters
20th-century American lawyers
20th-century American judges
Military personnel from Texas